Thomas Lamb may refer to:

 Thomas W. Lamb (1871–1942), Scottish-born American theater and cinema architect
 Thomas Lamb (industrial designer) (1896–1988), American textile and industrial designer, children's book illustrator
 Thomas F. Lamb (1922–2015), American politician (Pennsylvania State Senator and State House of Representatives)
Thomas Phillipps Lamb, English politician
 Tom Lamb (businessman), Manitoba businessman, founder of Lamb Air
 Tom Lamb (footballer) (born 1996), Australian rules footballer 
 Tom Lamb (artist) (1928–2016), British coal miner and artist